Vignesh Karthick is an Indian film and television actor, video and radio jockey, screenwriter, cinematographer and film director. He started his career by acting and directing short films and participating in reality shows, including the comedy game shows like "Athu Ithu Ethu" in STAR Vijay and Comedy Jodies in Zee Thamizh as a stand-up comedian. He later went on to host of those shows, especially the popular shows like Suriya Vanakkam, Thapal Petti En 8484 and many other shows in Sun TV and STAR Vijay respectively. In 2015, he started to work as Radio jockey with the radio station BIG FM 92.7. His short film "Yours Shamefully 2" which was directed by him with himself as the hero, has gained much popularity and appreciation from the audience and some people from the film industry. In 2016, he made his acting debut in films with Natpadhigaram 79 and in television with Pagal Nilavu. He made his directorial debut in films with Yenda Thalaiyila Yenna Vekkala.

Filmography

Anchor / Participant

Actor
Serials

Films

Short films

Radio Jockey

Director
Films

Short films

Web Series

Cinematographer
Films

Dubbing Artist

Awards and nominations

References

Living people
1988 births
Tamil male television actors
Television personalities from Tamil Nadu
Male actors in Tamil cinema
21st-century Tamil male actors
Indian television presenters
Tamil television presenters
Tamil comedians
Indian male comedians
Indian radio presenters
Male actors from Chennai